Aduvalli is a village in the southern state of Karnataka, India. It is located in the Belur taluk of Hassan district in Karnataka.

See also
 Hassan
 Mangalore
 Districts of Karnataka

References

External links
 http://Hassan.nic.in/

Villages in Hassan district